Katokkra is a village in Kyain Seikgyi Township, Kawkareik District, in the Kayin State of Myanmar. Katokkra is on the Haungtharaw River and lies only  from the border with Thailand.

References

External links
 "Katokkra Map — Satellite Images of Katokkra" Maplandia World Gazetteer

Populated places in Kayin State